Robert Inglis Gilfillan (29 June 1938 – 8 November 2012) was a Scottish professional footballer who played as a striker.

Career
Born in Cowdenbeath, Gilfillan played for Cowdenbeath Royals, Cowdenbeath, Newcastle United, St Johnstone, Raith Rovers, Southend United, Doncaster Rovers and Northwich Victoria.

References

1938 births
2012 deaths
Scottish footballers
Cowdenbeath F.C. players
Newcastle United F.C. players
St Johnstone F.C. players
Raith Rovers F.C. players
Southend United F.C. players
Doncaster Rovers F.C. players
Northwich Victoria F.C. players
Scottish Football League players
English Football League players
Association football forwards
People from Cowdenbeath
Footballers from Fife